Peter Planch Madsen (born 26 April 1978) is a retired Danish professional footballer who played as a striker.

He began and ended his career with Brøndby IF, winning the Danish Superliga three times and finishing as its joint top scorer in 2001–02. Abroad, he totalled 63 games and 18 goals in Germany's Bundesliga for VfL Wolfsburg, VfL Bochum and 1. FC Köln, and had a brief loan to England's Southampton in 2006.

Madsen played 13 games and scored three goals for the Denmark national team between 2001 and 2005. He was part of their squads at the 2002 FIFA World Cup and UEFA Euro 2004.

Club career
Born in Roskilde, Madsen started playing as a junior for Roskilde B 06, before he moved on to the youth team of Brøndby IF. He played 35 matches and scored nine goals for various Danish national youth teams from 1993 to 1999. He made his senior debut for Brøndby in April 1997, and went on to win three Danish Superliga championships and the 1998 Danish Cup in his six years with the club. He finished the 2001–02 season as joint league top scorer with Kaspar Dalgas.

Madsen was loaned to German team VfL Wolfsburg in January 2003, playing in the top-flight Bundesliga championship. A part of the loan contract was a June 2003 transfer deal worth 15 million DKK, but as Wolfsburg eventually rejected the transfer, Madsen ended up joining VfL Bochum of the same league in the summer 2003. In his first season with Bochum, Madsen scored 13 league goals.

As Bochum were relegated following the 2004–05 season, Madsen moved on to 1. FC Köln in July 2005. On 30 January 2006, he signed a loan deal with English Championship club Southampton, lasting until the end of the 2005–06 season. He scored twice in his nine league games before returning to Köln, who had then been relegated to the 2. Bundesliga. He played 13 games for Köln in that league before leaving the club. In May 2007, he agreed a move back to Brøndby IF, signing a five-year contract effective from 1 July.

International career
Madsen made his debut for the Denmark national team on 6 October 2001, in a 2002 FIFA World Cup qualifier at home to Iceland. He came on in the 69th minute as a substitute for Ebbe Sand. Morten Olsen named him for the 23-man squad at the final tournament in South Korea and Japan, where he was unused in a run to the last 16.

Olsen also called up Madsen to play at UEFA Euro 2004 in Portugal. He made his one tournament appearance in the 3–0 quarter-final loss to the Czech Republic, replacing Claus Jensen for the last 19 minutes at the Estádio do Dragão.

Capped 13 times, Madsen scored his only international goals on 18 August 2004 with a hat-trick in a 5–1 friendly win away to Poland in Poznań.

Personal life
In March 2020, Madsen tested positive for SARS-CoV-2 during the current pandemic of the disease. He had been infected at a birthday party in Amsterdam, which he attended with former teammates Christian Poulsen and Thomas Kahlenberg. He was tested after Kahlenberg had been tested positive. Madsen's only symptom was a slight headache and he was placed in home quarantine.

Career statistics

Club

International

Scores and results list Denmark's goal tally first, score column indicates score after each Madsen goal.

Honours
Brondby
Danish Superliga: 1996–97, 1997–98, 2001–02
Danish Cup: 1997–98

Individual
Danish Superliga top scorer: 2001–02 (22 goals)

References

External links

 

1978 births
Living people
People from Roskilde
Association football wingers
Danish men's footballers
Denmark international footballers
Denmark under-21 international footballers
Brøndby IF players
VfL Wolfsburg players
VfL Bochum players
1. FC Köln players
Southampton F.C. players
Lyngby Boldklub players
Danish Superliga players
Bundesliga players
2. Bundesliga players
English Football League players
UEFA Euro 2004 players
2002 FIFA World Cup players
Danish expatriate men's footballers
Expatriate footballers in Germany
Expatriate footballers in England
Danish expatriate sportspeople in Germany
Danish expatriate sportspeople in England
Sportspeople from Region Zealand